The Women's Marathon at the 2010 Commonwealth Games as part of the athletics programme was held at the Jawaharlal Nehru Stadium on Thursday 14 October 2010.

Results

External links
2010 Commonwealth Games - Athletics

Women's Marathon
2010
Commonwealth Games
2010 Commonwealth Games
2010 in women's athletics